Kuniyil Kailashnathan (25 May 1953) is a 1979 batch IAS Officer, served  then Gujarat Chief Minister Narendra Modi's as Chief Principal Secretary from 2013 to 2014.

Early life and family 
He grew up in Ooty, where his father worked in the Postal Department.

Career 
Kuniyil Kailashnathan started his career as an Assistant Collector Junior Timescale on September 1, 1981. He had served as Collector of Surendranagar (1985) and Surat (1987).

He had also been the Chief Executive Officer of Gujarat Maritime Board. In the Urban Sector, he served as the Municipal Commissioner of Ahmedabad from 1999 to 2001 and as the Principal Secretary of the Urban Development and Urban Housing Department of Gujarat (UDD). While at UDD, he chaired the Steering Committee that developed the Bus Rapid Transit Project for Ahmedabad.

He retired as Additional Chief Secretary in the Gujarat Chief Minister's Office (CMO) on May 31, 2013  ending 33 year service but was retained in the CMO as Chief Principal Secretary, a post that was created for him.

Education 
He holds postgraduate degrees from University of Madras (MSc Chem) and from University of Wales (MA Econ).

References 

1953 births
Living people
People from Tamil Nadu
Indian Administrative Service officers